Harshwardhan Chauhan (born 14 September 1964) is an Indian politician, who currently serves as Member of Legislative Assembly from Shillai constituency. Harshwardhan Chauhan won from Shillai constituency in 2017 state assembly elections. He is five times Member of Himachal Pradesh Legislative Assembly.

Early life and education
Chauhan was born on 14 September 1964 in Nahan, Sirmaur, Himachal Pradesh to Guman Singh Chauhan who was a former minister of Himachal Pradesh government .

He did his school education from St. Edward's school, Shimla. He graduated with a B.A. and LL.B. from Himachal Pradesh University.

Politics
Chauhan's active state politics started from 1993.

He previously won Himachal Pradesh Legislative Assembly Election in 1993 and was re-elected continuously in 1998, 2003 and 2007. He lost to Baldev Singh Tomar in 2012.

Then again in 2017, he was elected to the thirteenth Himachal Pradesh Legislative Assembly in December, 2017.

References
 

Indian National Congress politicians from Himachal Pradesh
1964 births
Living people
Himachal Pradesh MLAs 2017–2022